Handwriting is the debut album by the instrumental group Rachel's. It was released in May 1995 on Quarterstick Records.

Critical reception
Trouser Press wrote: "Using vibes, winds and traps, 'M. Daguerre' is the closest to jazz the ensemble gets, but the song’s main theme gives way to effective, unsettling improv, as well as delicate passages led by [Rachel] Grimes’ piano and a string section."

Track listing
 "Southbound to Marion" – 3:11
 "M. Daguerre" – 11:28
 "Saccharin" – 7:04
 "Frida Kahlo" – 1:53
 "Seratonin" – 3:34
 "Full on Night" – 14:32
 "Handwriting" – 1:48

Personnel
 Richard Barber – contra bass
 Nat Barrett – cello
 Marnie Christensen – violin
 Kevin Coultas – drum kit
 Christian Frederickson – viola
 Mark Greenberg – vibraphone
 Rachel Grimes – piano
 Gregory King – hand drums
 Michael Kurth – double bass
 Eve Miller – cello
 Jeff Mueller – orator
 Jason B. Noble – electric bass, guitars, tapes
 Barry Phipps – upright bass
 Jacob Pine – violin
 John Upchurch – clarinet, bass clarinet
 Bob Weston – double bass, electric bass

References

Rachel's albums
1995 albums
Quarterstick Records albums